The Institute of Systematics and Ecology of Animals (ISEA) located in Novosibirsk is one of the oldest research organization in the Siberian Branch of the Russian Academy of Sciences (SB RAS). The institute was founded in 1944 as Biomedical Institute, the first Siberian academic establishment working in biology.  The Siberian Zoological Museum of the ISEA SB RAS has the third-largest coleopteran collection in Russia. Some Siberian research organizations as the Central Siberian Botanical Garden SB RAS and the Institute of Soil Science and Agricultural Chemistry SB RAS were derived from the Institute former laboratories.

General background
The Institute research mission is the study of animal populations and communities structural and functional organization (as the base of living systems sustainable being and evolution) along with community ecology and biodiversity (animal systematics, inventory, monitoring and animal resource assessment).

The ISEA international activities include collaboration with researchers from the United Kingdom, Germany, the United States, Japan and China.

History
The institute was formed as the Biomedical Institute in 1944 due to the special Order of the USSR Sovnarkom (1943). It was renamed a few times:
 1944 —  the Biomedical Institute, the USSR Academy of Sciences West Siberian affiliate;
 1953 —  the Biological Institute, the USSR Academy of Sciences West Siberian affiliate;
 1959 —  the Biological Institute, the USSR Academy of Sciences Siberian Branch;
 1991 —  the Biological Institute,  the Russian Academy of Sciences Siberian Branch;
 1993 —  the Institute of Systematics and Ecology of Animals, the Russian Academy of Sciences Siberian Branch.

Institute directors
 1944—1951 — Victor V. Reverdatto, Prof, ScD
 1951—1953 — Sergey U. Stroganov, Prof, ScD
 1953—1954 — S. I. Gluzdakov, PhD
 1954—1955 — Kira A. Sobolevskaya, Prof, ScD
 1955—1978 — Alexey I. Cherepanov, Prof, ScD
 1978—2006 — Vadim I. Evsikov, Corresponding Member of RAS, Prof, ScD 
 since 2006 — Victor V. Glupov, Prof, ScD.

Research units
There are seven laboratories, one special research team, three research stations and one affiliated research and production unit in the institute.

Laboratories
 The Insect Pathology Laboratory (Lab Head: Ivan M. Dubovskiy, ScD);
 The Invertebrate Systematics Laboratory (Lab Head: Anatoly V. Barkalov, ScD);
 The Laboratory of Behavioral Ecology of Animal Communities (Lab Head: Zhanna I. Reznikova, Prof, ScD);
 The Laboratory of Vertebrate Community Ecology (Lab Head: Yury N. Litvinov, ScD);
 The Philogeny and Faunogenesis Laboratory (Lab Head: Andrei A. Legalov, ScD);
 The Population Structure and Dynamics Laboratory (Lab Head: Galina G. Nazarova, ScD);
 The Zoomonitoring Laboratory (Lab Head: Yury S. Ravkin, Prof, ScD).

 Special research team
 The Research Group in Avian Ecology (Team Head: Alexander K. Yurlov, PhD).

Research stations
 The Karasuk research station (Head: Vladimir A. Shilo, PhD);
 The Chany research station (Head: Alexander K. Yurlov, PhD);
 The Teletsky research station (Head: Igor I. Chupin, PhD).

The Siberian Zoological Museum
The Museum appeared in 1960 as a separate laboratory of the institute. Now it is curated by the researchers of the Invertebrate Systematics and the Philogeny&Faunogenesis Laboratories. The Siberian Zoological Museum has a vast scientific collection (650 animal families, more than 25 thousand species, 13 million samples, 1000 holotypes) including the third-largest coleopteran collection in Russia as well as some permanent exhibitions.

The Euroasian Entomological Journal
The Euroasian Entomological Journal started in 2002 due to the Siberian Zoological Museum of the ISEA SB RAS and the Zoological Museum of Moscow State University joint efforts. The Journal publishes original and qualitative scientific papers  on insect taxonomy, fauna, ecology, physiology etc. A Head Editor of the Journal is Prof ScD (Biology) Victor V. Glupov, the Director of the ISEA. His three deputies are PhD Sergei E. Tshernyshev (ISEA SB RAS), PhD Kirill G. Mikhailov (the MSU Zoomuseum, Moscow) and ScD Andrei A. Legalov (ISEA SB RAS).  There are competent entomologists from recognised research establishments and universities of Russia, Belarus, Ukraine and the United Kingdom in the Journal editorial board. The Journal periodicity is six issues per year.

References

Footnotes

Citations

Sources

External links

 
 
 
 
 
 
 
 
 
 
 
 The Euroasian Entomological Journal advisory board in 2004 (archived pages)
  	
 	

S
S
S
S
Science and technology in Siberia
Scientific organizations established in 1943
S
1944 establishments in the Soviet Union
Research institutes established in 1944